Magnises was a card-based membership club co-founded by convicted fraudster Billy McFarland in August 2013. Similar to another scam by McFarland, Ja Rule was the spokesman. The club card was not itself a real credit card; members could use it to make purchases only by first linking it to one of their pre-existing credit card accounts.

History

Card benefits
The company's namesake card, which was targeted to millennials, was widely compared to American Express's "Black Card" (officially known as the Centurion Card). Similarities between the two cards include that they were both black, made of metal, and promised exclusive perks to members. Despite appearances, however, Magnises's card was not a real charge card; instead, each card copied the magstripe information from a customer's existing Wells Fargo or Bank of America card, for which it could then be used as a substitute. By December 2013, the company had about 500 members. Benefits offered to members included VIP access to clubs, hotel discounts, and various exclusive events.

Business operations

The company was initially based out of a rented townhouse in the West Village neighborhood of Manhattan, New York City, New York. The owner of this townhouse filed a lawsuit against McFarland in 2015, alleging that McFarland had "trashed" the building, accusations which he denied. The case was settled in January 2016, and the company subsequently relocated its headquarters to the Chelsea neighborhood of Manhattan. By 2016, it was operating in New York City and Chicago, and, according to McFarland, its membership had grown to the tens of thousands.

Bankruptcy and fraud

After McFarland's Fyre Festival ended in a high-profile disaster in 2017, Magnises reportedly terminated its lease on its Chelsea office, and its website ceased allowing new customers to sign up. The company has retrospectively been described as a scam. In June 2018, after the Fyre Festival, McFarland was arrested again for selling fake tickets to the Coachella Festival and the Met Gala (apparently not considering the fact that the gala's list is personally vetted by Anna Wintour herself), being accused of acquiring up to $100,000 in this manner. McFarland was subsequently sentenced to six years in federal prison for various frauds in connection with the Fyre Festival.

See also

 Fyre Festival

References

American companies established in 2013
Companies disestablished in 2017